Gerry Saurer (died July 1992) was an Austrian football manager who is last known to have managed Kenya.

Career
In 1984, Saurer was appointed manager of Kenyan side AFC Leopards after managing in Switzerland and Seychelles. In 1990, he was appointed manager of Kenya.

References

Austrian football managers
Expatriate football managers in Kenya
1992 deaths
Year of birth missing
Kenya national football team managers